Kathleen Marie Sweet (born February 21, 1965) is a New York lawyer and is a former nominee to be a United States district judge of the United States District Court for the Western District of New York.

Biography

Sweet was born in Buffalo, New York on February 21, 1965. Sweet  received a Bachelor of Arts degree in 1987 from the Boston College. She received a Juris Doctor in 1990 from the Villanova University School of Law. She started her legal career as a confidential law clerk for the Appellate Division of the Supreme Court of the State of New York, Fourth Judicial Department from 1990 to 1992. From 1992 to 1993, she was an associate at the law firm of Damon & Morey LLP (now Barclay Damon LLP).  From 1993 to 1997, Sweet worked at the law firm of Brown & Tarantino LLP (now The Tarantino Law Firm), where she was elevated to partnership in 1995.  In 1997 she joined the law firm of Gibson, McAskill & Crosby, LLP in Buffalo, New York as an associate and was later elevated to partnership in 1998 where she specializes in medical malpractice cases.

Expired nomination to district court

On March 16, 2016 President Obama nominated Sweet to serve as a United States District Judge of the United States District Court for the Western District of New York, to the seat vacated by Judge William M. Skretny, who took senior status  on March 8, 2015. On June 21, 2016 a hearing before the Senate Judiciary Committee was held on her nomination. Her nomination was reported to the floor on September 8, 2016. Her nomination expired on January 3, 2017, with the end of the 114th Congress.

See also
 Barack Obama judicial appointment controversies

References

1965 births
Living people
Boston College alumni
New York (state) lawyers
Lawyers from Buffalo, New York
Villanova University School of Law alumni